The Färentuna runestones are 11th century runestones labelled U 20, U 21, and U 22 in the Rundata catalog that are located in Färentuna, Uppland, Sweden. Runestones U 20 and U 21 were registered separately although they come from the same original runestone and consequently are called U 20/21. The runestone U 20/U 21 is probably most interesting as it, together with the Hillersjö stone and the Snottsta and Vreta stones, tells the story of the family of Gerlög and Inga. All of the Färentuna runestones are inscribed in the younger futhark.

U 20/U 21

The two fragments named U 20 and U 21 were originally part of the same runestone and were discovered under the plaster of a wall during the renovation of the church at Färentuna. It is likely that other fragments of this runestone may also be part of the church but have their inscriptions facing inwards. They are held to tell of the same family as the Hillersjö stone and the Snottsta and Vreta stones. This runestone is believed to have been raised by Inga in memory of her husband Eric (Eiríkr) and her father Godric (Guðríkr). The runestone has been attributed to the runemaster known as Torbjörn or Þorbjôrn Skald, who signed the Hillersjö stone.

Transliteration
... ...k * bunta sin ... auk -... ...(u)þrik * faþur sin * gu... ...-b... ...n- *

Transcription
... [Æiri]k(?), bonda sinn ... ok ... [G]uðrik, faður sinn. Gu[ð hial]p[i a]n[d].

Translation
... Eiríkr(?) his/her husbandman ... and ... Guðríkr, his/her father. May God help (his) spirit.

U 22

The runic text of U 22 is within a serpent that circles the edge of the stone. This runestone is classified as being carved in either runestone style Pr2 or Pr3.

Transliteration
ulfr * uk uikil + uk syrkil * þa... ...- stain * þina i(f)(t)iʀ ayt--u faþur sin ku*þ (h)ia[lbi] a-t

Transcription
Ulfʀ ok Vikell ok Syrkell/Sørkell þæ[iʀ] ... stæin þenna æftiʀ <ayt--u>, faður sinn. Guð hialpi a[n]d.

Translation
Ulfr and Vékell and Syrkell/Sørkell, they ... this stone in memory of ... their father. May God help (his) spirit.

See also
List of runestones

References

Sources

Inga och Estrid - en såpa för tusen år sedan: Människor, händelser och platser i Ingas och Estrids liv. A page at the Museum of Stockholm County.

Runestones, Gerlög and Inga
Runestones in Uppland
11th-century inscriptions